Eddie Benjamin is an Australian singer-songwriter and music producer based in Los Angeles, California. He has written and produced for artists such as Meghan Trainor, Earth, Wind & Fire, and Shawn Mendes while also touring with Justin Bieber in 2022. He released his debut EP Emotional in 2021.

Biography 
Benjamin was born and raised in Australia. While attending Rose Bay Secondary College in Sydney, he met Tash Wolf and Indy Linzbichler with whom he would form the group Haze Trio. The group toured Australia and won competitions, including the statewide talent search for YouthRock 2016.
 
In 2019, Benjamin moved to Los Angeles, California, where he wrote and produced for artists such as Meghan Trainor and Earth, Wind & Fire. He also worked with Justin Bieber, whom he met through a mutual friend, later appearing in the artist's 2021 documentary.
 
In 2020 he released his debut single "Fuck My Friends", which he co-produced with Dan Gleyzer. He followed this with his debut EP Emotional in 2021 and toured with Justin Bieber on the 2022 Justice World Tour. He also co-wrote and produced the 2021 Shawn Mendes single "It'll Be Okay", which peaked at No. 2 on the Billboard Bubbling Under Hot 100. In June 2022, Maura Johnston, writing in Time, listed Benjamin's song "Weatherman" as one of "The Best Songs of 2022 So Far".

Personal life 
Benjamin is the son of musician Huey Benjamin and choreographer Narelle Benjamin. He has a sister, Marlo, who is a dancer. From 2019 to early 2023 he dated actress and dancer Maddie Ziegler.

Discography

Extended plays

Singles

Other works

References

External links 
 Official website

Living people
Australian singer-songwriters
Epic Records artists
2000 births
